Yalom's Cure is a 2014 documentary film about the life and work of American psychiatrist and bestseller author Irvin D. Yalom by Swiss director and writer Sabine Gisiger. Yalom invites viewers to think about themselves and their existence.

Plot 
Yalom's Cure takes viewers on an existential journey through the many layers of the human psyche. In the film, Irvin D. Yalom reflects on the meaning of life and how to lead a fulfilled life. He offers profound insights into the knowledge he has gained over many years and into his own spiritual life.

Born in 1931, the psychiatrist and author Irvin D. Yalom is seen as one of the most influential psychotherapist in the United States. The film traces his background and career by means of flashbacks using photos and Super 8 footage from his family archive. Re-enactments of therapy sessions illustrate the method of group therapy which Yalom developed together with others. Starting with his main works, including Love's Executioner (1989), The Schopenhauer Cure (2005) and his 1992 novel When Nietzsche Wept, the director accompanies Yalom in his daily life and talks to him about human existence, love, happiness and the fear of death. In these in-depth conversations, the director interweaves Yalom's professional and private life.

The film also observes Yalom in conversation with his wife and together with his children and grandchildren. All four children are divorced, while Yalom and his wife have been a couple since their youth. The family members reflect on the reasons for this and refer to Yalom's ideas on existential psychotherapy.

The film was made for the cinema and has a meditative narrative rhythm and poetic imagery: Yalom is shown cycling, at a family gathering, and cooking. There are also numerous underwater scenes.

Release 
Yalom's Cure premiered at the Locarno Film Festival in August 2014 where it was screened out of competition. In October 2014 the film was selected to the São Paulo International Film Festival and at the Mill Valley Film Festival in St Raphael CA.

In more than ten countries the documentary was released in cinemas. In Switzerland it attracted an audience of 50,000, in Germany 90,000 entries. Further starts were, among others, in the United States, Canada, Greece and Spain.

Critical response 
Los Angeles Times film critic Michael Rechtshaffen has emphasized the film's meditative approach:

In her article on the portal Cineuropa, Muriel del Don highlights the film's successful merger of the professional and private image of Yalom:

According to C. L. Illsley from Montreal Rampage, the film accentuates that Yalom himself lives according to his own theories and beliefs formulated in his books:

Awards and nominations 
 2015: Swiss Film Award, nomination as Best Documentary
 2015: Swiss Film Award, nomination as Best Score
 2015: Cultural Department of the City of Zurich, 1. prize for the most successful documentary of the year

References

External links

  
 
 Website of the US-American distributor

Swiss documentary films
2014 films
Documentary films about psychology
American psychiatrists
2014 documentary films
2010s English-language films